George Allen Meyers (October 9, 1899 – July 15, 1978), nicknamed "Deacon", was an American Negro league pitcher in the 1920s.

A native of Columbia, Tennessee, Meyers made his Negro leagues debut in 1921 with the St. Louis Giants. He played four seasons with the St. Louis Stars, and finished his career in 1926 with the Dayton Marcos. Meyers died in Dayton, Ohio in 1978 at age 78.

References

External links
 and Seamheads

1899 births
1978 deaths
Dayton Marcos players
St. Louis Giants players
St. Louis Stars (baseball) players
Baseball pitchers
Baseball players from Tennessee
People from Columbia, Tennessee
20th-century African-American sportspeople